Atlantic Conveyor was a British merchant navy ship, registered in Liverpool, that was requisitioned during the Falklands War.

She was hit on 25 May 1982 by two Argentine air-launched AM39 Exocet missiles, killing 12 sailors. Atlantic Conveyor sank whilst under tow on 28 May 1982.

The wrecksite is designated under the Protection of Military Remains Act 1986.

History

Atlantic Conveyor was a 14,950 ton roll-on, roll-off container ship owned by Cunard. She was built along with six other container ships, each named with the prefix Atlantic, and each sailing under different national flags by different companies for the Atlantic Container Line consortium.

Along with her sister ship, Atlantic Causeway, Atlantic Conveyor was requisitioned by the Ministry of Defence at the beginning of the Falklands War through the STUFT system (Ships Taken Up From Trade). Due to the short timescales, the decision that the ship was not "a high-value unit", and a controversy over whether arming auxiliaries was legal, Atlantic Conveyor was not fitted with either an active or a passive defence system.

The ships were used to carry supplies for the Royal Navy Task Force sent by the British government to retake the Falkland Islands from Argentine occupation. Sailing for Ascension Island on 25 April 1982, Atlantic Conveyor carried a cargo of six Wessex helicopters from 848 Naval Air Squadron and five RAF Chinook HC.1s from No. 18 Squadron RAF.  At Ascension, she picked up eight Fleet Air Arm Sea Harriers (809 Squadron) and six RAF Harrier GR.3 jump jets.

One Chinook of B flight No. 18 Squadron RAF left Atlantic Conveyor to support operations on Ascension. With the aircraft stored she then set sail for the South Atlantic. On arrival off the Falklands in mid-May, all of the Harriers were off-loaded to the carriers; the GR.3s going to HMS Hermes while the Sea Harriers were divided amongst the existing squadrons on Hermes and HMS Invincible. With the additional aircraft on Hermes a Lynx HAS.2 helicopter was flown and parked on Atlantic Conveyor on 20 May 1982.

On 25 May 1982 (the same day as the loss of HMS Coventry)  Atlantic Conveyor was hit by two AM39 Air Launched Exocet missiles fired by two Argentine Navy Super Étendard jet fighters. The mission was led by Corvette Captain Roberto Curilovic (call sign 'Tito'), flying Super Etendard 0753/3-A-203, and his wingman, Warship Lieutenant Julio Barraza, (call sign 'Leo') flying in 0754/3-A-204 — both from 2da Escuadrilla Aeronaval de Caza y Ataque.

Both Exocets struck Atlantic Conveyor on the port quarter of the ship. There are conflicting accounts on whether the warheads exploded after penetrating the ship's hull, or on impact. Witness Prince Andrew reported that debris caused "splashes in the water about a quarter of a mile away". He said that the incident "was an experience I shall never forget ... horrific". All the survivors were taken to HMS Hermes.

Due to the presence of both fuel and ammunition that were stored below decks, the incendiary effect of the unburnt propellant from the missiles caused an uncontrollable fire. When the fire had burnt out, the ship was boarded but nothing was recovered. While under tow by the requisitioned tug Irishman, Atlantic Conveyor sank in the early morning of 28 May 1982. Six Westland Wessexes, three Boeing Chinooks, and a Westland Lynx were destroyed by fire; only one Chinook (ZA718 'Bravo November') and one Westland Wessex, were saved. The loss of these helicopters meant that British troops had to march on foot across the Falklands to recapture Stanley.

Twelve men died in Atlantic Conveyor, including the ship's master, Captain Ian Harry North, who was posthumously awarded the Distinguished Service Cross (DSC). The ship was the first British merchant vessel lost at sea to enemy fire since World War II.

The ship's replacement was built on Tyneside.

Crew

The vessel carried a Merchant Navy crew of 33. This included 12 officers (master, chief officer, second officer, third officer, radio officer, chief engineer, second engineer, two third engineers, fourth engineer, electrician and purser), 10 petty officers (bosun, four mechanics, two first cooks, second cook and baker, second cook and second steward) and 11 ratings (five seamen, three greasers and three assistant stewards). Of the 12 men killed in the sinking of Atlantic Conveyor six were from the Merchant Navy, three from the Royal Fleet Auxiliary and three sailors from the Royal Navy.

As the last resting place of the remains of those who died, the wreck is designated as a protected place under the Protection of Military Remains Act 1986.

The officers' bar on M/V Atlantic Conveyor, built 1984 in Swan Hunter, Wallsend is named "The North Bar" after Captain Ian North.

Further reading
 Charles Drought – N. P. 1840 The Loss of the Atlantic Conveyor (2003) 
 Board of Inquiry into the Loss of SS Atlantic Conveyor

Notes and references

Container ships
Merchant ships of the United Kingdom
Shipwrecks of the Falklands War
Maritime incidents in 1982
Falklands War naval ships of the United Kingdom
Protected Wrecks of the United Kingdom
1969 ships
Ships built by Swan Hunter
Ships built on the River Tyne
Ships sunk by Argentine aircraft
Merchant ships sunk by aircraft